Viali is a surname. Notable people with the surname include:

Tonino Viali (born 1960), Italian middle distance runner
William Viali (born 1974), Italian footballer and manager

See also
Viali di Circonvallazione, streets in Florence, Italy

Italian-language surnames